The Charles A. Whitten Medal was established by the American Geophysical Union to honor Charles A. Whitten for his contributions to research in crustal movements, such as plate tectonics. This medal, which was first awarded to Charles A. Whitten, recognizes outstanding achievement in research on the form and dynamics of the Earth and planets. The Charles A. Whitten Medal is given no more than every other year. 

Charles A. Whitten was a geodesist with the U.S. Coast and Geodetic Survey who made outstanding contributions to the geodetic sciences and the work of the American Geophysical Union. He was the best known American geodesist of his day, and his kindness to his colleagues and devotion to his profession are legendary.

See also
 List of geodesists
 List of geophysicists
 List of geophysics awards
 Prizes named after people

References

American Geophysical Union awards
Awards established in 1985
1985 establishments in the United States